"Jamaica Farewell" is a Jamaican-style folk song (mento).  The lyrics for the song were written by Lord Burgess (Irving Burgie), an American-born, half-Barbadian songwriter. It is about the beauties of the West Indian Islands.

Harry Belafonte recording
The song appeared on Harry Belafonte's 1956 album Calypso. It reached number 14 on the Billboard Pop chart.

Background
Many, including Belafonte himself, have said that the song was popular in the West Indies since long before Burgess. It is believed that Burgess compiled and modified the song from many folk pieces to make a new song. Burgess acknowledged his use of the tune of another mento, "Iron Bar". The line "ackee, rice, saltfish are nice" refers to the Jamaican national dish.

Covers
Artists who have covered "Jamaica Farewell" include:
 Chuck Berry (feat. The Five Dimensions)
 Sir Lancelot
 Don Williams
 Jimmy Buffett
 Sam Cooke
 Nina & Frederik
 Carly Simon
 Laura Veirs, on her 2011 album Tumble Bee
 Caetano Veloso and Sting, while playing a medley of his own "Can't Stand Losing You / Reggatta de Blanc" while still with The Police in 1983
 Carleton "Bill" Bailey on the album Cruising With Bill Bailey (recorded while on board ) (1960)
 Ray Conniff Orchestra, on the album Happiness Is (1966)
 James Last Orchestra, on the album Music From Across The Way (1971)
 The Jukebox Band, on the TV show Shining Time Station, episode "Bully for Mr. Conductor"
 Austrian pop singer Chris Denning (alias Helmut Rulofs) in 1978
 Desmond Dekker, on the album Caribbean Playground.
 Lil Ugly Mane, in a section of "Side Two-A" on the album Third Side of Tape
 Robin Cook aka Jonas Ekfeldt
 Fisherman's Friends, on the album Sole Mates
 The Kingston Trio, who led the folk revival of the late 1950s, took their name from the mention of Kingston, Jamaica in the song; though they only recorded it years later, in 2006.

In other languages
This song has been translated into many languages. For example, in Bengali, there exist several translations, some of which are quite well known. One Bengali version of the song became an important anthem for the Naxalite revolutionary movement in the 1970s and thus has significance for Bengali intellectuals in Kolkata society. The Bangladeshi band Souls also sang their own translated version in early 1990s, which instantly became a hit in Bangladesh.

The song was covered with lyrics in Swedish by Schytts as Jamaica farväl, scoring a 1979 Svensktoppen hit. Streaplers recorded a 1967 Swedish-language version of the song, with the lyrics "Långt långt bort". Their version became a 1968 Svensktoppen hit.

German translations are "Abschied von Kingston Town" ("Farewell from Kingston Town") by Bruce Low and "Weil der Sommer ein Winter war" ("For the Summer was a Winter") by Nana Mouskouri.
The Vietnamese translation is "Lời Yêu Thương" ("Love Words") by Đức Huy

Parodies
In his album My Son, the Folk Singer, Allan Sherman included a parody of the song on "Shticks and Stones": "I'm upside down, my head is spinning around, because I gotta sell the house in Levittown!"
A filk music parody "Change at Jamaica Farewell" makes fun of the Long Island Rail Road.

Soundtrack appearances
This song was featured in the 2009 video game, Rabbids Go Home, at numerous points in the game. It further was featured in episode 8 of season 1 of the TV series, Barry.

See also
 Hymn tune
 Long metre
 Kingston Town (song)

References

External links
 Song lyrics
 Purdue University article on Ackee
 Calypso Artists List

1957 songs
Jamaican songs
Calypso songs
Mento
Streaplers songs
Schytts songs
Songs about Jamaica
Harry Belafonte songs